Mark Ouimet (born October 2, 1971 in London, Ontario) is a Canadian retired ice hockey centre.

He played for the Baltimore Skipjacks, Worcester IceCats, and Adirondack Red Wings, all members of the American Hockey League, and the Baton Rouge Kingfish of the ECHL.

He played in Europe for SC Herisau (along with brother Terry), Rapperswil-Jona Lakers and ZSC Lions in Nationalliga A and GCK Lions in Nationalliga B.

He played college hockey for the Michigan Wolverines.

Awards and honours

References

External links

1971 births
Adirondack Red Wings players
Anaheim Bullfrogs players
Baltimore Skipjacks players
Baton Rouge Kingfish players
Canadian emigrants to Switzerland
Canadian expatriate ice hockey players in the United States
Canadian expatriate ice hockey players in Switzerland
Canadian ice hockey centres
Franco-Ontarian people
GCK Lions players
Living people
Michigan Wolverines men's ice hockey players
Naturalised citizens of Switzerland
SC Herisau players
SC Rapperswil-Jona Lakers players
Sportspeople from London, Ontario
Washington Capitals draft picks
Worcester IceCats players
ZSC Lions players